Download Series Volume 3 is a live album by the rock band the Grateful Dead.  It was recorded on October 26, 1971, at The Palestra in Rochester, New York.  It was released as a digital download on July 5, 2005.

This was the fifth show with new band member Keith Godchaux on keyboards. He was added as a member because of the failing health of Ron "Pigpen" McKernan. This release is an almost complete concert; it drops "Beat It On Down the Line" which was played after "Loser".  The album was mastered in HDCD by Jeffrey Norman.

Track listing
Disc one
First set:
"Bertha" (Robert Hunter, Jerry Garcia) - 7:38
"Playing in the Band" (Hunter, Mickey Hart, Bob Weir) - 6:41
"Sugaree" (Hunter, Garcia) - 8:09
"Me and My Uncle" (John Phillips) - 3:59
"Tennessee Jed" (Hunter, Garcia) - 6:55
"Jack Straw" (Hunter, Weir) - 5:29
"Big Railroad Blues" (Noah Lewis) - 4:04
"Me And Bobby McGee" (Fred Foster, Kris Kristofferson) - 6:16
"Cumberland Blues" (Hunter, Garcia, Phil Lesh) - 6:12
"Cold Rain And Snow" (trad., arr. Grateful Dead) - 5:59
"Mexicali Blues" (John Barlow, Weir) - 3:30
"Loser" (Hunter, Garcia) - 6:45
Disc two
"El Paso" (Marty Robbins) - 4:43
"Comes A Time" (Hunter, Garcia) - 8:08
"One More Saturday Night" (Weir) - 4:52
Second set:
"Ramble On Rose" (Hunter, Garcia) - 6:54
"Sugar Magnolia" (Hunter, Weir) - 6:34
"Truckin'" > (Hunter, Garcia, Lesh) - 10:34
"Drums" >  (Bill Kreutzmann) - 6:54
"The Other One" >  (Kreutzmann, Weir) - 16:06
"Johnny B. Goode" (Chuck Berry) - 4:20

Personnel
Grateful Dead
Jerry Garcia – lead guitar, vocals
Keith Godchaux – keyboards
Bill Kreutzmann – drums
Phil Lesh – electric bass, vocals
Bob Weir – rhythm guitar, vocals
Production
Rex Jackson – recording
Jeffrey Norman – mastering

References

03
2005 live albums